Jean-Philippe Ardouin (born 5 March 1964) is a French politician of La République En Marche! (LREM) who has been serving as a member of the French National Assembly since the 2017 elections, representing the department of Charente-Maritime.

In parliament, Ardouin serves as member of the Defence Committee. In addition to his committee assignments, he is part of the French-Indonesian Parliamentary Friendship Group.

See also
 2017 French legislative election

References

1964 births
Living people
Deputies of the 15th National Assembly of the French Fifth Republic
La République En Marche! politicians
Deputies of the 16th National Assembly of the French Fifth Republic